Justice Burks or Judge Burks may refer

Edward C. Burks (1821-1897), associate justice of the Supreme Court of Virginia
Martin P. Burks (1851-1928), associate justice of the Supreme Court of Virginia
Marion E. Burks (1912-1989), Illinois judge and politician